Dietrich Möller (born 3 November 1937 in Dortmund) is a German politician, member of the Landtag of Hesse (CDU) and former mayor of Marburg.

Möller was the chairman of VfB Marburg from 2005 until 2013.

References 

1937 births
Living people
Politicians from Dortmund
Christian Democratic Union of Germany politicians
Members of the Landtag of Hesse
Mayors of Marburg
German hunters
VfB Marburg
Officers Crosses of the Order of Merit of the Federal Republic of Germany
People from the Province of Westphalia